The 3079th Aviation Depot Wing, Air Materiel Command, United States Air Force, headquartered at Wright-Patterson Air Force Base, Ohio, was a weapons of mass destruction unit of key strategic importance and special weapons storage wing active until 1962.

It had five Aviation Depot Groups storing and maintaining nuclear weapons, The 3080th Aviation Depot Group at Caribou AFS / Loring AFB, ME (17 Dec 1951 – 1 Jul 1962); 3081st Aviation Depot Group at Rushmore AFS / Ellsworth AFB, SD (4 Feb 1952 – 1 Jul 1962); 3082nd Aviation Depot Group at Deep Creek AFS / Fairchild AFB, WA (4 Apr 52 - 1 Jul 1962); 3083rd Aviation Depot Group at Fairfield AFS / Travis AFB, CA (4 Sep 1952 – 1 Jul 1962); and 3084th Aviation Depot Group at Stoney Brook AFS / Westover AFB, MA (17 Mar 54 - 1 Jul 1962); plus three squadrons which transported special weapons worldwide using C-124 Globemaster II aircraft. These were the 7th Logistic Support Squadron at Robins Air Force Base, Warner Robins, Georgia, the 28th Logistic Support Squadron based in Hill Air Force Base, Ogden, Utah, and the 19th Logistic Support Squadron based at Kelly Air Force Base, San Antonio, Texas.

The 3079th ADW was inactivated effective 1 July 1962.

References

3079